Saving Me is an animated science fiction sitcom created by Aaron Johnston for BYUtv. The show follows the adventures of an elderly senior billionaire named Bennett Bramble, as he tries to teach himself how to be good and make good choices with his childhood self, Young Bennett. Despite his attempts at doing so, his plans constantly backfire, usually resulting in bad things happening or chaos ensuing.

The show is the first animated series to be created for BYU TV. It is produced by Sphere Animation (formerly known as Oasis Animation), a Montreal-based animation studio known for their work on the last six seasons of Arthur, the Netflix animated series Kulipari, and Riley Rocket, among others.

The first season, consisting of 10 episodes, premiered on BYUtv on October 1, 2022, and ended on December 5th of the same year. The second season, also consisting of 10 episodes, is scheduled to premiere in spring 2023.

Overview
In the far future, 61-year old Bennett Bramble is lonely and has garnered a negative reputation. He has tried ways to become less hated in the present, to no avail. With no other ways to fix his reputation, Bennett builds a time machine that allows him to travel into the past as a conscious and enter the mind of his younger 11-year old self.

After doing so, he meets Young Bennett, his younger self from fifty years ago. Bennett wants to teach himself the correct choices to make, and he also hopes to repair his grim future. The only problem is that Bennett has forgotten how to be good, so teaching his younger self how to do so causes many bizarre things to happen- whether it be Moose Ninja going haywire after drinking water, Sophie becoming a stunt woman after getting her hands on a fear-free helmet, or a secret compound gradually transforming undercover agents into sasquatches.

Characters
 Old Bennett Bramble (voiced by Ivan Sherry) - The main protagonist. He is a grumpy tech billionaire who discovers that he's been despised by everyone in the future. He decides to go back to the past, crossing paths with his younger self in the process. He plans to help his younger self become better, unaware that he hasn't learned how to be good in decades.
 Young Bennett Bramble (voiced by Adam Sanders) - Old Bennett's younger, pre-teen self. Unlike his future self, he's more friendly and intelligent. After confronting Old Bennett, he agrees to team up with him so that he can learn how to become a better person, and build up relationships with his family.
 Mark Bramble (voiced by Dan Chameroy) - Young Bennett's father.
 Carla Bramble (voiced by Ana Sani) - Young Bennett's mother.
 Liam Bramble (voiced by Jonathan Tan) - Young Bennett's older brother.
 Sophie Bramble (voiced by Amariah Faulkner) - Young Bennett's younger sister. She is the only family member to have her hair dyed.
 Edee 34 (voiced by Cory Doran) - The Bramble family's robot assistant.
 Commander Crumb (voiced by Jamie Watson)
 Penelope Snodgrass (voiced by Stacey De Pass)
 Flip Nealy (voiced by Jeffrey Knight)
 Megumi (voiced by Amanda Joy)

Development 
Saving Me was created by Aaron Johnston. Daniel Scott composed the soundtrack for the show. Production of the series began in January 2021. In August 2022, BYUtv announced that they had greenlit the show for two 10-episode seasons, the first of which was slated to premiere at the beginning of October 2022.

The first season was officially released online at byutv.org and on the BYUtv App on October 1, 2022 A 2-part sneak peek was also shown on BYUtv in-between sessions of the Church of Jesus Christ of Latter-day Saints October General Conference. The series then moved to Monday nights and aired its entire season after the 10th Anniversary episodes of Studio C. On October 27, 2022, it was confirmed that WildBrain had signed on as a global distributor for the series.

Episodes

Season 1 (2022)

Reception 

On IMDb, Saving Me holds a rating of 8.3/10.

References

BYU TV original programming
2020s American animated television series
2020s Canadian animated television series
2020s American comic science fiction television series
2020s Canadian comic science fiction television series
2020s American comedy-drama television series
2020s Canadian comedy-drama television series
2020s American sitcoms
2020s Canadian sitcoms
2022 American television series debuts
2022 Canadian television series debuts
American children's animated comic science fiction television series
Canadian children's animated comic science fiction television series
American children's animated drama television series
Canadian children's animated drama television series
American flash animated television series
Canadian flash animated television series
American animated sitcoms
Canadian animated sitcoms
English-language television shows
Animated television series about children